The Komoé River or Comoé River is a river in West Africa. The river originates on the Sikasso Plateau of Burkina Faso, flow through the Cascades de Karfiguéla, forms a short section of the border between Burkina Faso and Ivory Coast until it enters Ivory Coast, where it is the major drainage for northeastern portion of that country before emptying into the Atlantic. The banks of the Komoé are shaded by riparian forests along most of it length providing an important habitat for wildlife and a source of agricultural water.  Where reliable floodplains form in Ivory Coast, rice may be grown.  A portion of the river in northern Ivory Coast is the source of the vegetative richness that earned that area a UNESCO World Heritage Site designation, Comoé National Park.

Course

The Komoé River is approximately 759 km long. It rises on the Sikasso Plateau and in the Sindou Hills flowing south over several cataracts with several falls including the "Chutes de la Komoé" and Karifiguela Falls. Upstream of the Karifiguela Falls it is known locally as the Koba River.

In Ivory Coast, it continues southeast, past the Comoé National Park, forming the border between its Zanzan District and Savanes District. At  it turns south flowing through eastern Ivory Coast and emptying into the far eastern end of the Ébrié Lagoon complex and ultimately the Gulf of Guinea near the port of Grand-Bassam.

Tributaries
 Léraba River at  a right tributary from the west,
 Boin River at  a left tributary from the north in Comoé National Park.

References

Rivers of Burkina Faso
Rivers of Ivory Coast
Burkina Faso–Ivory Coast border
International rivers of Africa